Three of a Kind is a 2004 Hong Kong comedy film written, produced and directed by Joe Ma and starring Michael Hui, Miriam Yeung and Lau Ching-wan.

Cast and roles
 Michael Hui as Dragon Lone
 Miriam Yeung as Sophia
 Lau Ching-wan as Frankie
 Elaine Jin as Barbara
 Benz Hui as P Leung	
 Lo Mang as Lone's dad
 Hiro Hayama as Alex
 Monica Lo	as Isabel
 Yuan Yuan as Mr. Tang
 Jin Song as Jet
 Kristal Tin as Victoria	
 Tiffany Lee as Loretta
 Courtney Wu as Advertising agency owner
 Matt Chow as Slipper game attendant
 Chin Wing-wai as Tony Qua
 Wong Chui-yee as Lone's mother
 Chan Pak-lei as HK Gifted Writer (20 years old)
 Harriet Yeung as HK Gifted Writer (20 years old)
 Chiu Yue-ming as HK Gifted Writer (20 years old)
 Cheung Nam as Lone's one-eyed monk character
 Shao Xiao-shan as Lone's heroine character
 Kong Foo-keung as Rascal

External links
 
 HK cinemagic entry
 loveHKfilm entry

2004 films
Hong Kong slapstick comedy films
2004 comedy films
2000s Cantonese-language films
Films directed by Joe Ma
China Star Entertainment Group films
Films about writers
Films set in Hong Kong
Films shot in Hong Kong
2000s Hong Kong films